Walter S. McMillen (24 November 1913 – 11 May 1987) was a Northern Irish footballer. His regular position was as a defender. 

Born in Belfast, he played for Distillery, Manchester United, Cliftonville Strollers, Cliftonville Olympic, Chesterfield, Millwall, Glentoran and Linfield and also won 7 caps for Ireland (Irish Football Association).

External links
Northern Ireland Football Greats
MUFCInfo.com profile

1913 births
1987 deaths
Association footballers from Northern Ireland
Chesterfield F.C. players
Manchester United F.C. players
Cliftonville F.C. players
NIFL Premiership players
Lisburn Distillery F.C. players
Pre-1950 IFA international footballers
Association footballers from Belfast
Glentoran F.C. players
Linfield F.C. players
Millwall F.C. players
English Football League players
Association football defenders